San Matéo is a Bolivian river in the Cochabamba Department, Tiraque Province and in the Chapare Province, Villa Tunari Municipality. It belongs to the Amazon River watershed.

San Matéo River flows to Villa Tunari in a northeasterly direction. Shortly before reaching the town it receives waters from its most important tributary, the Ivirizu River, which comes from the south. In the east of Villa Tunari San Matéo River meets Espíritu Santo River coming from the west. From the point of the confluence the river is known as Chapare River.

References 

 lib.utexas.edu Detailed map of the area

External link

Rivers of Cochabamba Department